Torrance Heather Castellano (born January 8, 1979) is an American percussionist and the former drummer of The Donnas. She announced her retirement from drumming in July 2010.

About 
Castellano was born in San Francisco, California. She met future bandmates Maya Ford, Brett Anderson and Allison Robertson in junior high school. They formed a band in 8th grade called Ragady Anne, later calling themselves The Electrocutes at Palo Alto High School.

Before the release of The Donnas' sixth studio album Gold Medal, Castellano developed tendonitis and in October 2003, she had surgery for it. During her recovery, she had to take drum lessons to re-learn to hold drum sticks the correct way. For Gold Medal, she recorded with her recovering wrists, but could only play for short periods of time.

A shoulder problem forced Castellano to withdraw from The Donnas' tour following a show on December 27, 2008 at the House Of Blues in Anaheim, California. Amy Cesari of the band The Demonics filled in on future tour dates. On July 9, 2010, Castellano announced on the band's website that due to her shoulder she would have to retire from drumming and performing with The Donnas. Castellano still attended events the band was involved with as well as promoted the last album she recorded with the band, Greatest Hits Vol. 16.

She attended Santa Monica College before transferring to Stanford University, majoring in political science. Castellano graduated from Stanford with distinction and attended Harvard Law School. While at Harvard, she interned for Adalah, Habeas Corpus Research Center, and Article 36.  As a Frederick Sheldon Traveling Fellow at Harvard, she designed a legal research project on the way cracks in domestic and international legal frameworks lead to a deprivation of rights for the residents of areas that are de facto no man’s land, created by protracted conflicts, focusing on East Jerusalem and eastern Ukraine. She interviewed key human rights attorneys working to protect human and civil rights, Israeli government officials, and local residents in the Kafr Aqab neighborhood.

References

External links
The Donnas’ official website

on Pearl Artist Roster
on Vic Firth

1979 births
American women drummers
American rock drummers
The Donnas members
Drummers from San Francisco
Living people
Palo Alto High School alumni
Santa Monica College alumni
Stanford University alumni
People from Palo Alto, California
Harvard Law School alumni
20th-century American drummers
20th-century American women musicians
21st-century American women musicians
21st-century American drummers